Beech Forest is a town in Victoria, Australia. The area of Beech Forest is largely used for potato farming.

History 
The town was named after the many myrtle beech trees of the area. Beech Forest Post Office opened on 10 May 1890 and closed in 1994.

Infrastructure 
The town had a railway station on the Crowes railway line from 1902 until 1962. Much of the route of the old railway has been converted to the Old Beechy Rail Trail, via which cyclists and walkers can travel  between Beech Forest and Colac.

Notable residents 

 Cliff Young, winner of the 1983 Westfield Sydney to Melbourne Ultra Marathon at the age of 61

References

External links

Walkabout Travel Guide - Beech Forest
 Bureau of Meteorology Daily Rainfall - Beech Forest

Towns in Victoria (Australia)
Otway Ranges